In the United States, the legality of incest varies widely between jurisdictions regarding both the definition of the offense and penalties for its commission.

Overview

In all but two states (and the special case of Ohio, which "targets only parental figures"), incest is criminalized between consenting adults.  In New Jersey and Rhode Island, incest between consenting adults (16 or over for Rhode Island, 18 or over for New Jersey) is not a criminal offense, though marriage is not allowed in either state.  New Jersey also increases the severity of underage sex offenses by a degree if they are also incestuous, and criminalizes incest with 16-17 year olds (the normal age of consent in New Jersey is 16).  Ohio allows incest between consenting adults only when one party is not a parental figure (see table below) to the other.

, cases of incest involving consenting adults are often not revealed to outside parties, and therefore prosecutions of these cases do not frequently occur. Cases of parent-adult child incest exposed to law enforcement are usually uncovered by another parent.

Table
The table below summarizes these laws for individual U.S. States and the District of Columbia.

{| class="wikitable" align="center"
|+Laws regarding incest in the United States: States :  :  :
|-
! Jurisdiction
! Prohibited relationships
! Prohibited acts
! Penalties
|-
|Alabama
|Either legitimately or illegitimately:

 His ancestor or descendant by blood or adoption; or
 His brother or sister of the whole or half-blood or by adoption; or
 His stepchild or stepparent, while the marriage creating the relationship exists; or
 His aunt, uncle, nephew or niece of the whole or half-blood.
| Marriage, intercourse
|A Class C felony, punishable by a prison term of "...not more than 10 years or less than 1 year and 1 day..." and a fine of up to $15,000.
|-
| Alaska
| Either legitimately or illegitimately:

 an ancestor or descendant of the whole or half blood; or
 a brother or sister of the whole or half blood; or 
 an uncle, aunt, nephew, or niece by blood.
| Sexual penetration (being 18 years of age or older)
| A Class C felony, punishable by a prison term "between 1 to 5 years" and up to a $50,000 fine.
|-
| style="background-color:pink" | American Samoa
|A person he knows to be:

 his ancestor or descendant by blood or adoption; or
 his stepchild or stepparent, while the marriage creating that relationship exists and while the stepchild is 18 years of age or less; or
 his brother or sister of the whole or half-blood; or
 his uncle, aunt, nephew, or niece of the whole blood.
| Marriage, sexual intercourse, deviate sexual intercourse
| A Class D felony, punishable by a prison term "not to exceed 5 years" and up to a $5,000 fine.
|-
| Arizona
| Persons with degrees of consanguinity which makes marriage incestuous and void. These are:

 between parents and children, including grandparents and grandchildren of every degree
 between brothers and sisters of the one-half as well as the whole blood, and
 between uncles and nieces, aunts and nephews and between first cousins
 Exception: first cousins may marry if both are 65 years of age or older, and can prove to a superior court judge in the state that one of the cousins is unable to reproduce.
| Marriage, intercourse (cited in state law as fornication), or adultery
| A class 4 felony, with an imprisonment term ranging between 1 and 3 and three-quarter years, depending on the severity.
|-
| Arkansas
| The person committing the act being at least 16 years of age, knowingly, and without regard to legitimacy, including blood relationships:

 An ancestor or a descendant;
 A stepchild or adopted child;
 A brother or sister of the whole or half blood;
 An uncle, aunt, nephew, or niece; or
 A stepgrandchild or adopted grandchild.
| Marriage, sexual intercourse, or deviate sexual activity with a prohibited person.
| A Class C felony punishable by imprisonment from 3 to 10 years for the first offense and a fine of up to $10,000.
|-
| California
| Being 14 years of age or older, persons within degrees of consanguinity which make marriages incestuous and void, without regard to the legitimacy of the relationship. These are:

 Parents and children
 Ancestors and descendants of every degree
 Siblings of the half or whole blood
 Uncles or aunts & nieces or nephews
| Marriage, sexual intercourse (cited in state law as fornication) or adultery
| "...imprisonment in the state prison" (specific penalty not described by state law)
Registration as a sex offender (for life until January 1, 2021; at least 20 years from date of conviction [if only serving probation] or date of release as of January 1, 2021)
|-
| Colorado
| Ancestor or descendant, including a natural child, child by adoption, or stepchild, a brother or sister of the whole or half blood, or an uncle, aunt, nephew, or niece of the whole blood ("descendant" includes a child by adoption and a stepchild, but only if the person is not legally married to the child by adoption or the stepchild). 
| Marriage, sexual penetration, sexual intrusion, sexual contact
| Incest: 2y to 6y and $2,000 (minimum) to $500,000 fine; Aggravated incest: 4y to 12 y and $3,000 (minimum) to $750,000 fine. A conviction for incest or aggravated incest will also result in a sentence of lifetime supervision, which means electronic tagging for life, under the Lifetime Supervision of Sex Offenders Act 1998, which also applies to incest, under Part 10 of Title 18 of the Colorado Revised Statutes. 
|-
| Connecticut
| Any person related within degrees specified in 46b-21; No man may marry his mother, grandmother, daughter, granddaughter, sister, aunt, niece, stepmother or stepdaughter, and no woman may marry her father, grandfather, son, grandson, brother, uncle, nephew, stepfather or stepson.

"a person is guilty of sexual assault in the third degree when such person engages in sexual intercourse with another person whom the actor knows to be related to him or her within any of the degrees of kindred specified in the statute that specifies which relatives are prohibited from marrying one another."
| Marriage; sexual intercourse
| 1y to 5y and $5,000 fine
|-
| Delaware
| Without regard to legitimacy or adoption, male & his child, parent, brother, sister, grandchild, niece or nephew, father's sister or brother, mother's sister or brother, father's wife, wife's child, child of his wife's son or daughter; female & her parent, child, brother, sister, grandchild, niece or nephew, father's sister or brother, mother's sister or brother, mother's husband, husband's child, child of her husband's son or daughter.
| Sexual intercourse
| Up to 1y and $2,300 fine
|-
| style="background-color:yellow" | District of Columbia
| Any person related to another person (not including the 4th degree of consanguinity); marriage void if between man with his grandmother, grandfather's wife, wife's grandmother, father's sister, mother's sister, mother, stepmother, wife's mother, daughter, wife's daughter, son's wife, sister, son's daughter, daughter's daughter, son's son's wife, daughter's son's wife, wife's son's daughter, wife's daughter's daughter, brother's daughter, sister's daughter; between woman with her grandfather, grandmother's husband, husband's grandfather, father's brother, mother's brother, father, stepfather, husband's father, son, husband's son, daughter's husband, brother, son's son, daughter's son, son's daughter's husband, daughter's daughter's husband, husband's son's son, husband's daughter's son, brother's son, sister's son.
| Marriage, cohabitation, sexual intercourse
| Up to 12y and $37,500 fine
|-
| Florida
| Any person related by lineal consanguinity, or a brother, sister, uncle, aunt, nephew, or niece 
| Marriage, sexual intercourse (defined as the penetration of the female sex organ by the male sex organ, however slight; emission of semen is not required).
| Up to 5y (up to 15y in some cases) and $5,000 fine
|-
| Georgia
| Person known to be (by blood or marriage): (1) Father and child or stepchild; (2) Mother and child or stepchild; (3) Brother and sister of the whole blood or of the half blood; (4) Grandparent and grandchild; (5) Aunt and nephew; or (6) Uncle and niece. 
| Sexual intercourse
| 10y to 30y
|-
| Hawaii
| Persons within degrees of consanguinity or affinity within which marriage is prohibited.
| Sexual penetration
| Up to 5y
|-
| Idaho
| Persons within degrees of consanguinity which make marriages incestuous and void.
| Marriage, sexual intercourse, adultery
| Up to life imprisonment
|-
| Illinois
| Person related to other person as a (i) Brother or sister, either of the whole blood or the half blood; or (ii) Father or mother, when the child, regardless of legitimacy and regardless of whether the child was of the whole blood or half-blood or was adopted, was 18 years of age or over when the act was committed; or (iii) Stepfather or stepmother, when the stepchild was 18 years of age or over when the act was committed .
| Sexual penetration
| 2y to 10y and $25,000 fine (more if specified)<ref>ILCS § 720 ILCS 5/11-11 and PENALTIES FOR CRIMES IN ILLINOIS, LEGISLATIVE RESEARCH UNIT, ILLINOIS GENERAL ASSEMBLY</ref>
|-
| Indiana
| Person known to be biological parent, child, grandparent, grandchild, sibling, aunt, uncle, niece, or nephew. 
| Sexual intercourse, deviate sexual conduct, marriage (unless valid where entered)
| 1y to 6y (advisory)
|-
| Iowa
| Legitimately or illegitimately: Person knows to be ancestor, descendant, brother or sister of whole or half blood, aunt, uncle, niece or nephew. 
| Sexual act
| Up to 5y and $7,500 fine
|-
| style="background-color:pink" | Guam
| An ancestor or descendant, a brother or sister of the whole or half blood or an uncle, aunt, nephew or niece of the whole blood.
| Knowing marriage or cohabitation
| Up to 1y
|-
| Kansas
| Person known to be biologically related as parent, child, grandparent of any degree, grandchild of any degree, brother, sister, half-brother, half-sister, uncle, aunt, nephew, niece.
| Marriage, sexual intercourse, sodomy
| 5m-13m (simple), 31m-136m (aggravated) and/or up to $100,000 fine for either simple or aggravated. 
|-
| Kentucky
| Known ancestor, descendant, brother, or sister without regard to legitimacy, adoption, whole or half blood, or stepparent and stepchild.
| Sexual intercourse or deviate sexual intercourse 
| 5y to life imprisonment
|-
| Louisiana
| Ascendant or descendant, brother or sister, uncle or niece, aunt or nephew (with knowledge), related by consanguinity either whole or half blood 
| Marriage (unless married legally in another state) or sexual intercourse.
| 5y to 30y
|-
| Maine
| Persons known to be within the 2nd degree of consanguinity (woman and her father, grandfather, son, grandson, brother, brother's son, sister's son, father's brother or mother's brother; man and his mother, grandmother, daughter, granddaughter, sister, brother's daughter, sister's daughter, father's sister or mother's sister).
| Sexual intercourse (any penetration of the female sex organ by the male sex organ) 
| Up to 5y and/or $5000 fine
|-
| Maryland
| Persons who may not marry, within 3 degrees of lineal consanguinity or 1 degree of collateral consanguinity (an individual's grandparent, parent, child, sibling, grandchild, grandparent's spouse, spouse's grandparent, parent's sibling, stepparent, spouse's parent, spouse's child, child's spouse, grandchild's spouse, spouse's grandchild, or sibling's child).
| Vaginal intercourse 
| 1y to 10y
|-
| Massachusetts
| Persons within degrees of consanguinity which make marriages incestuous and void.
| Marriage, sexual intercourse, sexual activities (including but not limited to, oral or anal intercourse, fellatio, cunnilingus, or other penetration of a part of a person's body, or insertion of an object into the genital or anal opening of another person's body, or the manual manipulation of the genitalia of another person's body) 
| Up to 20y
|-
| Michigan
| Criminal sexual conduct in the 4th degree includes when the actors are related "by blood or affinity to the third degree."
| Sexual contact
| Up to 2y or a fine of up to $500 or both
|-
| Minnesota
| Person "nearer of kin to the actor than first cousin…whether of the half or the whole blood, with knowledge of the relationship".
| Sexual intercourse 
| Up to 10y
|-
| Mississippi
| Person within degrees of consanguinity which make marriages incestuous and void due to blood. 
| Marriage or cohabitation, adultery or sexual intercourse 
| Up to 10y or $500 fine
|-
| Missouri
| Persons known to be ancestor or descendant by blood or adoption; stepchild while the marriage creating the relationship exists; brother or sister of whole or half blood; or uncle, aunt, nephew, or niece of the whole blood.
| Marriage, cohabitation, sexual intercourse, sexual contact 
| Up to 7yMO. REV. STAT. § 568.020
|-
| Montana
| Person known to an ancestor, a descendant, a brother or sister of the whole or half-blood, or a stepson or step-daughter, without regard to legitimacy, adoption, or step- relationship.
| Marriage, cohabitation, sexual intercourse, sexual contact 
| Up to life imprisonment or up to $50,000 fine 
|-
| Nebraska
| Between parents and children, grandparents and grandchildren of every degree, between brothers and sisters of the half as well as the whole blood, and between uncles and nieces, aunts and nephews. Extend to children and relations born out of wedlock or any person who sexually penetrates a minor stepchild.
| Marriage, sexual penetration
| 1y to 25y
|-
| Nevada
| Persons within degrees of consanguinity which make marriages incestuous and void.
| Marriage, fornication, adultery
| 2y to life imprisonment and $10,000 fine
|-
| New Hampshire
| Person know to be an ancestor, descendant, brother or sister (whole or half blood), and uncle, aunt, nephew, or niece without regard to legitimacy, stepchildren, and relationships of parent and child by adoption.
| Marriage, cohabitation (under the representation of marriage), sexual intercourse 
| 10y to 20y
|-
| New Jersey
| When the actor is "related to the victim by blood or affinity to the 3rd degree" and the victim is at least 16 but less than 18 years old.
Underage sexual offences are increased in severity by a degree if also incestuous.

Consensual incest between people 18 years old or more is not a criminal offense.
| Sexual penetration (2nd degree sexual assault) or sexual contact (4th degree criminal sexual contact)
| At least 15y without parole (2nd degree sexual assault) or up to 18m (4th degree criminal sexual contact)
|-
| New Mexico
| Persons known to be parents and children (including grandparents and grandchildren of every degree), brothers and sisters of half and whole blood, uncles and nieces, aunts and nephews.
| Marriage or sexual intercourse 
| Up to 3y and $5,000 fine 
|-
| New York
| Persons known to be related to him or her, whether through marriage or not, as an ancestor, descendant, brother or sister of either the whole or the half blood, uncle, aunt, nephew or niece.  Half-blood uncle/niece marriages are valid pursuant to a 2014 State Court decision.  See  https://www.courthousenews.com/half-blood-uncle-niece-couples-endorsed-in-ny/
| Marriage, sexual intercourse, oral sexual conduct, or anal sexual conduct
| 10y to 25y
|-
| North Carolina
| Person that is grandparent or grandchild; parent or child or stepchild or adopted child; brother or sister of whole or half-blood; uncle aunt, nephew or niece.
| Carnal intercourse
| 10m to 182m
|-
| North Dakota
| Persons known to be within a degree of consanguinity which makes marriages void between: parents and children, including grandparents and grandchildren of every degree; brothers and sisters of the half as well as the whole blood; uncles and nieces of the half as well as the whole blood; aunts and nephews of the half as well as the whole blood; first cousins of the half as well as the whole blood (illegitimate and legitimate children and relatives).
| Marriage, cohabitation, sexual activity 
| Up to 5y and $10,000 fine
|-
| style="background-color:pink" | Northern Mariana Islands
|A person who is related either legitimately or illegitimately, as
(1) an ancestor or descendant of the whole or half blood;
(2) a brother or sister of the whole or half blood; or
(3) an uncle, aunt, nephew, or niece by blood
| A person 18 years of age or older engages in sexual penetration
| Up to 5y and $2,000 fine
|-
| Ohio
| Actor is the victim's "natural or adoptive parent, step-parent guardian, custodian, or person in loco parentis of the other person".
| Sexual conduct
| 2y to 8y
|-
| Oklahoma
| Persons within degrees of consanguinity which make a marriage incestuous and void.
| Marriage, fornication, adultery 
| Up to 10y
|-
| Oregon
| Persons known to be related, legitimately or otherwise as Ancestors, descendants, or brother or sister of whole or half blood.
| Marriage, sexual intercourse, deviate sexual intercourse 
| Up to 20y and $375,000 fine
|-
| Pennsylvania
| Ancestor or descendant, a brother or sister of whole or half-blood, or an uncle, aunt, nephew, or niece of whole blood (blood relationships without regard to legitimacy, and relationship of parent and child by adoption).
| Marriage, cohabitation, sexual intercourse 
| Up to 10y
|-
| style="background-color:pink" | Puerto Rico
| Persons who have a relationship of kinship, by being ascendant or descendant, by consanguinity, adoption or affinity, or collateral by consanguinity or adoption, until the third degree, or by sharing or possessing physical custody or parental authority.
| Sexual intercourse.
| 50y (8y if the party promoting the conduct is a minor who has not turned 18 if prosecuted as an adult.)
|-
| Rhode Island
| No person shall marry his or her sibling, parent, grandparent, child, grandchild, stepparent, grandparents' spouse, spouse's child, spouse's grandchild, sibling's child or parent's sibling.
Consensual incest between people 16 years old or more is not a criminal offense.
| Marriage 
| None
|-
| South Carolina
| (1) A man with his mother, grandmother, daughter, granddaughter, stepmother, sister, grandfather's wife, son's wife, grandson's wife, wife's mother, wife's grandmother, wife's daughter, wife's granddaughter, brother's daughter, sister's daughter, father's sister or mother's sister; (2) A woman with her father, grandfather, son, grandson, stepfather, brother, grandmother's husband, daughter's husband, granddaughter's husband, husband's father, husband's grandfather, husband's son, husband's grandson, brother's son, sister's son, father's brother or mother's brother.
| Carnal intercourse 
| 6m to 5y and $500 minimum fine
|-
| South Dakota
| Marriages between parents and children, ancestors and descendants of every degree, and between brothers and sisters of the half as well as the whole blood, and between uncles and nieces, or aunts and nephews, and between cousins of the half as well as of the whole blood, are null and void from the beginning, whether the relationship is legitimate or illegitimate and include such relationships that arise through adoption.
| Mutually consensual sexual penetration 
| Up to 15y and $30,000 fine
|-
| Tennessee
| Any person known to be natural parent, child, grandparent, grandchild, uncle, aunt, nephew, niece, stepparent, stepchild, adoptive parent, adoptive child or brother and sister of the half or whole blood.
| Sexual penetration 
| 3y to 15y and up to $10,000 fine
|-
| Texas
| Person known to be ancestor or descendant by blood or adoption; current or former stepchild or stepparent; parent's brother or sister of the whole or half blood; brother or sister of the whole or half blood or by adoption; children of the actor's brother or sister of the whole or half blood or by adoption; the son or daughter of the actor's aunt or uncle of the whole or half blood or by adoption. 
| Sexual intercourse (any penetration of the female sex organ by the male sex organ), deviate sexual intercourse (any contact between the genitals of one person and the mouth or anus of another person with intent to arouse or gratify the sexual desire of any person) 
| 2y to 20y and up to $10,000 fine
|-
| style="background-color:pink" | United States Virgin Islands
| INCEST:  Persons being within the degrees of consanguinity within which marriages are declared by law to be void (V.I. CODE ANN. TIT. 14, § 961);
VOID MARRIAGES:
(a) A marriage is prohibited and void from the beginning,
without being so decreed and its nullity may be shown in any collateral proceeding, when it is between-
 (1) a man and his grandmother, grandfather's wife, wife's grandmother, father's sister, mother's sister, mother, stepmother, wife's mother, daughter, wife's daughter, son's wife, sister, son's daughter, daughter's daughter, son's son's wife, daughter's son's wife, wife's son's daughter, wife's daughter's daughter, brother's daughter or sister's daughter;
 (2) a woman and her grandfather, grandmother's husband, husband's grandfather, father's brother, mother's brother, father, stepfather, husband's father,son, husband's son, daughter's husband, brother, son's son, daughter's son, son 's daughter's husband, daughter's daughter's husband, husband's son's son, husband's daughter's son, brother's son or sister's son; or
 (3) any persons either of whom has been previously married and whose previous marriage has not been terminated by death or a decree of divorce.
(b) Any of such marriages may also be declared to have been null and void by judicial decree.
(V.I. CODE ANN. TIT. 16, § 1)
| who knowingly intermarry with each other,
or who commit fornication or adultery with each other
| shall each be imprisoned for not more than 10 years.
|-
| Utah
| Person known to be ancestor, descendant, brother, sister, uncle, aunt, nephew, niece, or first cousin, without regard to whole or half blood relationship, legitimacy, parent and child by adoption, or relationship of stepparent and stepchild while the marriage creating the relationship of a stepparent and stepchild exists.
| Sexual intercourse (not amounting to rape, rape of a child or aggravated sexual assault) 
| Up to 5y and $5,000 fine
|-
| Vermont
| Persons for whom marriage are prohibited by state law.
| Marriage, fornication 
| Up to 5y and $1,000 fine
|-
| Virginia
| Persons for whom marriages are prohibited; relations with children and grandchildren.
| Adultery or fornication 
| 1y to 10y and up to $2,500 fine (18 years of age or older);  5y to 20y and up to $100,000 fine (under 18 years of age) 
|-
| Washington
| Persons known to be related to him or her, either legitimately or illegitimately, as an ancestor, descendant, brother, or sister of either the whole or the half blood.
| 1st degree incest: sexual intercourse; 2nd degree incest: Sexual contact 
| 1st degree incest: up to 10y and up to $20,000 fine; 2nd degree incest: up to 5y and up to $10,000 fine;
|-
| West Virginia
| Engaging with his or her father, mother, brother, sister, daughter, son, grandfather, grandmother, grandson, granddaughter, nephew, niece, uncle or aunt. The definition of parent and child includes adoptive and step.
| Sexual intercourse (any act between persons involving penetration, however slight, of the female sex organ by the male sex organ or involving contact between the sex organs of one person and the mouth or anus of another person) or sexual intrusion (any act between persons involving penetration, however slight, of the female sex organ or of the anus of any person by an object for the purpose of degrading or humiliating the person so penetrated or for gratifying the sexual desire of either party) 
| 5y to 15y and $500 to $5,000 fine
|-
| Wisconsin
| Persons known to be blood relatives and such relative is in fact related in a degree within the marriage is prohibited by the law 
| Marriage or nonmarital sexual intercourse. 
| Up to 40y and $100,000 fine
|-
| Wyoming
| Persons known to be an ancestor or descendant or a brother or sister of the whole or half blood, including relationships of parent and child by adoption, blood relationships without regard to legitimacy, stepparent and stepchild. 
| Sexual intrusion, sexual contact 
| Up to 15y and $10,000 fine
|}

Notes
 According to a California Supreme Court case, being under the age of 18 in a consensual incestual relationship with an adult causes the minor to be a victim of the crime of incest, not an accomplice to the crime itself. See People v. Tobias (2001) 25 Cal.4th 327 However, this does not include a minor 14 years of age or older as the law was amended by the Legislature to partially overturn the ruling. See Stats. 2005, Ch. 477, Sec. 1. (SB 33).

References

External links
 
 Hughes, Graham. "The Crime of Incest" (PDF). Journal of Criminal Law and Criminology'', Fall 1964. Volume 55, Issue 3 (September), Article 2, p. 322-331.
 State Criminal Incest Statutes , March 2013.  National District Attorneys Association.

Incest
Family law
Sex laws
Family law in the United States